King's Hall School is a co-educational prep school that provides day and Boarding school. The school is located within the parish of  Cheddon Fitzpaine, just north of Taunton, Somerset, in the West of England. It is housed in the Grade II* listed building Pyrland Hall. It was named King's Hall School after Pyrland Hall joined with King's House.

History
King's Hall School was originally the boys Junior House of King's College, Taunton, and remains a partner school. Both are Woodard Schools which means they are part of a group of Anglican schools (both primary and secondary) affiliated to the Woodard Corporation (formerly the Society of St Nicolas) which has its origin in the work of Nathaniel Woodard, an Anglo-Catholic clergyman. Since it was established in 1953, the school has been housed in Pyrland Hall.

Pyrland Hall School, as it was previously known, was a boy's preparatory school (ages 8–13) that amalgamated with King's House, a girl's preparatory school, which also had a pre-preparatory unit, to form King's Hall School in 1987.

In 2010, Magnus Mowat, the chair of the school's governors was given the award Independent School Governor of the Year.
The school's catering facilities were  Gold Award Winners in the Taste of the West Awards in 2010/11.

References

External links
 School website
 Profile on the ISC website

Preparatory schools in Somerset
Boarding schools in Somerset
Woodard Schools
Educational institutions established in 1987
1987 establishments in England
Church of England private schools in the Diocese of Bath and Wells
Anglo-Catholic educational establishments